Oxymonacanthus is a genus of filefishes native to the Indian and Pacific Oceans.

Species
There are currently 2 recognized species in this genus:
 Oxymonacanthus halli N. B. Marshall, 1952 (Red Sea longnose filefish)
 Oxymonacanthus longirostris Bloch & J. G. Schneider, 1801 (Harlequin filefish)

References

Monacanthidae
Marine fish genera
Taxa named by Pieter Bleeker